The 2016 Oregon State Treasurer election was held on November 8, 2016, to elect the Oregon State Treasurer. Incumbent treasurer Ted Wheeler (D) is term-limited and successfully ran for mayor of Portland. Tobias Read (D) was elected to succeed him.

Democratic primary 

 Tobias Read, state representative

Results

Republican primary 
 Jeff Gudman, Lake Oswego City Councilor

Results

Independent Party primary
 Chris Telfer, former state senator

Results

Polling

Results

References 

State treasurers of Oregon
State Treasurer
Oregon state treasurer elections
Pennsylvania